The 2014–15 Central Arkansas Sugar Bears basketball team represented the University of Central Arkansas during the 2014–15 NCAA Division I women's basketball season. The Bears were led by third year head coach Sandra Rushing and play their home games at the Farris Center. They are members of the Southland Conference.  The Sugar Bears entered the 2015 Southland Conference women's basketball tournament as the seventh seed and were paired against the sixth seeded Northwestern State Lady Demon's.  The team's season ended with a 49–63 tournament game loss to the Lady Demons.  The Sugar Bears final 2014–15 overall record was 17–14 while the conference record was 10–8.

Roster

Schedule
Source:  

|-
!colspan=9 style="background:#4F2D7F; color:#818A8F;"| Out of Conference Schedule

|-
!colspan=9 style="background:#4F2D7F; color:#818A8F;"| Southland Conference Schedule

|-
!colspan=9 style="background:#4F2D7F; color:#818A8F;"| Southland Conference tournament

See also
 2014–15 Central Arkansas Bears basketball team

References

Central Arkansas Sugar Bears basketball seasons
Central Arkansas
Central Arkansas Bears basketball team
Central Arkansas Bears basketball team